George Benjamin Hunter may refer to:

Politicians
 George Hunter (mayor) (1788–1843), first mayor of Wellington, New Zealand 
 George Hunter (politician, born 1821) (1821–1880), his son, New Zealand politician
 George Hunter (politician, born 1859) (1859–1930), his son, New Zealand politician
 George Robert Hunter (1884–1949), member of the New Zealand Legislative Council

Sportspeople
 George Hunter (baseball) (1887–1968), baseball player for the 1909 Brooklyn Superbas
 George Hunter (boxer) (1927–2004), South African boxer
 George Hunter (footballer, born 1885) (1885–1934), English footballer, played for Manchester United
 George Hunter (footballer, born 1902) (1902–?), English footballer for Sunderland
 George Hunter (footballer, born 1930) (1930–1990), Scottish footballer, played for Celtic and Derby County
 George Hunter (rugby league) (1928–2009), Australian rugby league player and coach
 George Hunter (rugby union) (born 1991), Scottish Rugby Union player, plays for Glasgow Warriors 
 George Hunter (speedway rider) (1939–1999), former Scottish motorcycle speedway rider
 George Hunter (Australian footballer) (1874–1944), Australian rules footballer

Others
 George Hunter (author) (1867–1927), American authority on decorative art
 George Hunter (Coca-Cola bottler) (1886–1950), businessman and philanthropist who made his fortune bottling Coca-Cola
 George Hunter (photographer) (1921–2013), Canadian journalistic photographer
 George Burton Hunter (1845–1937), British shipping magnate
 George W. Hunter (missionary) (1861–1946), Scottish missionary with the China Inland Mission to Xinjiang
 George W. Hunter III, parasitologist and educator with the US Army Sanitary Corps and Army Medical School
 George William Hunter (1863-1948), wrote Civic Biology, the text at the center of the Scopes "monkey" trial
 George King Hunter (1855–1940), U.S. Army general

See also
 Leslie Hunter (George Leslie Hunter, 1879–1931), Scottish painter and colourist